Duarte de Sousa da Mata Coutinho was a Portuguese nobleman and the 8th High-Courier of the Kingdom of Portugal.

See also 
Luís Gomes da Mata Coronel
Luís Gomes da Mata
Correio-Mor Palace
Palace of the Counts of Penafiel

High-Courier of the Kingdom of Portugal
Portuguese nobility

pt:Correio-mor